Iván Martín Núñez (born 14 February 1999) is a Spanish professional footballer who plays as a midfielder for La Liga club Girona, on loan from Villarreal CF.

Club career
Martín was born in Bilbao, Biscay, Basque Country, but was raised in Torre Pacheco, Murcia. He moved to Villarreal CF in February 2012, from lowly locals EF Torre Pacheco, and was promoted to the C-team ahead of the 2017–18 campaign, in Tercera División.

Martín made his senior debut on 27 August 2017, starting in a 0–0 away draw against Crevillente Deportivo. He scored his first goal the following 21 January, netting the winner in a 2–1 away defeat of CD Roda.

Martín was promoted to the reserves in August 2018, also becoming a regular starter for the side. He made his first team debut the following 17 January, coming on as a late substitute for fellow youth graduate Alfonso Pedraza in a 1–3 loss at RCD Espanyol, for the season's Copa del Rey.

On 14 August 2020, Martín was loaned to Segunda División side CD Mirandés for the season. He scored his first professional goal on 19 September, netting the opener in a 1–1 home draw against Real Oviedo.

On 10 July 2021, Martín moved to La Liga side Deportivo Alavés, on a one-year loan deal. The following 27 January, after featuring rarely, he moved to Girona FC in the second level, also in a temporary deal.

Career statistics

Club

References

External links

1999 births
Living people
Spanish footballers
Footballers from Bilbao
Association football midfielders
La Liga players
Segunda División players
Segunda División B players
Tercera División players
Villarreal CF C players
Villarreal CF B players
Villarreal CF players
CD Mirandés footballers
Deportivo Alavés players
Girona FC players
Spain youth international footballers
Footballers from the Region of Murcia